Vincent de Paul Lunda Bululu (born 15 October 1942) is a Congolese former politician. He served as the Prime Minister of Zaire from 5 July 1990 to 1 April 1991. He previously served as First State Commissioner of Zaire from 4 May 1990 to 5 July 1990. He attended the University of Lubumbashi and earned a Doctor of Laws degree.

References

1942 births
Living people
Prime Ministers of the Democratic Republic of the Congo
People from Katanga Province
University of Lubumbashi alumni
21st-century Democratic Republic of the Congo people